XHKOK-FM is a radio station on 88.9 FM in Acapulco, Guerrero, Mexico. It is operated by Grupo Radio Visión and carries its Imagen Radio news/talk format.

History

XEKOK-AM 1380 received its concession on October 5, 1978. It was owned by Jesús Gil Reatiga and broadcast as a 1 kW daytimer from Las Cruces, Guerrero.

In the 1990s, XEKOK moved to Acapulco and 750 kHz. It also increased its power to 5 kW.

In November 2010, XEKOK was cleared to move to FM as XHKOK-FM 107.5. The station changed frequencies to 88.9 MHz on October 20, 2020, in order to clear the reserved band for indigenous and community stations.

Starting January 3, 2022, the four Radiorama stations in Acapulco (XHKOK, XHCI, XHNS, and XHPA) were leased to a new operator, Grupo Radio Visión. Three took on formats from Radiópolis, while XHKOK affiliated with Imagen Radio.

References

Radio stations in Guerrero
Radio stations established in 1978